Jackson Creek is a creek in Peterborough, Ontario, Canada. It is part of the Great Lakes Basin, and flows to its mouth at Little Lake as a right tributary of the Otonabee River. The Otonabee flows via the Trent River to Lake Ontario.

In 1963 the Otonabee Region Conservation Authority received a grant for construction of a dam on Jackson Creek. The creek overflowed in July 2004, causing extensive damage.

See also
List of rivers of Ontario

References

Peterborough, Ontario
Rivers of Peterborough County